The 2020 Campeonato Ecuatoriano de Fútbol Serie A (until 18 September 2020 officially known as the LigaPro Banco Pichincha 2020 for sponsorship reasons) was the 62nd season of the Serie A, Ecuador's top tier football league, and the second under the management of the Liga Profesional de Fútbol del Ecuador (or LigaPro). Delfín were the defending champions. Barcelona won their 16th domestic league title after defeating LDU Quito 3–1 on penalties following a 1–1 draw on aggregate score in the finals.

The competition was suspended from 14 March to 14 August due to the COVID-19 pandemic.

Format
The format for the 2020 season was decided by LigaPro's Council of Presidents on 22 October 2019. For this season, the league returned to the three-stage system used before the 2019 season, scrapping the play-off stage played in the previous season. The first and second stages were played as single round-robin tournaments with all teams playing each other once for a total of 15 matches per stage. The first stage fixture was reversed for the second stage, and the top teams at the end of each stage qualified for the finals as well as the Copa Libertadores group stage. The finals were a double-legged series between the winners of both stages with a penalty shoot-out deciding the champion in case of a tie in points and goals scored. In case a team won both stages of the season, the finals would not have been played and that team would win the championship.

An aggregate table including the matches of both the first and second stages was used to decide international qualification and relegation, with the best two teams (other than the stage winners) qualifying for the Copa Libertadores, and the next best three teams qualifying for the Copa Sudamericana. The remaining Copa Sudamericana berth would have been allocated through the 2020 Copa Ecuador, which was cancelled due to the COVID-19 pandemic and had its berth reallocated to the next best team in the aggregate table. Meanwhile, the teams that ended in the 15th and 16th place of the aggregate table would have competed in relegation play-offs against the third- and fourth-placed teams of the 2020 Serie B for the right to remain in the top tier for the following season, however, in a Council of Presidents session held on 23 May 2020 it was decided not to expand the Serie A to 18 teams for the 2021 season, meaning that the bottom two teams of the aggregate table at the end of the season were relegated to Serie B.

Teams

Stadia and locations

Personnel and kits

Managerial changes

Effects of the COVID-19 pandemic
On 14 March 2020 after two Matchday 5 games had been played, the competition was suspended indefinitely by LigaPro due to the COVID-19 pandemic.

On 20 May LigaPro's Council of Presidents decided to tentatively resume the league on 17 July pending final approval by the Ecuadorian government, with matches to be played behind closed doors. That same day the Council approved to restart training activities on 8 June, which was later moved to 10 June per decision by the National Emergency Operations Committee (COE). However, the date for the resumption of the competition was pushed back as the protocol approved by the Ecuadorian government through the National COE had set 29 July as the earliest tentative date for resumption. 

On 27 July, the National COE approved LigaPro's biosecurity protocol and established 15 August as the tentative date to resume the competition. Eventually, on 11 August the National COE approved LigaPro's request to resume the competition on 14 August, with the completion of the fifth matchday.

First stage

Standings

Results

Second stage

Standings

Results

Finals
LDU Quito and Barcelona qualified for the Finals (Third stage) by being the First stage and Second stage winners, respectively. The winners were the Serie A champions and earned the Ecuador 1 berth in the 2021 Copa Libertadores, and the losers were the Serie A runners-up and earned the Ecuador 2 berth in the 2021 Copa Libertadores. By having the greater number of points in the aggregate table, LDU Quito played the second leg at home.

Tied 1–1 on aggregate, Barcelona won on penalties.

Aggregate table

Top goalscorers
{| class="wikitable" border="1"
|-
! Rank
! Name
! Club
! Goals
|-
| align=center | 1
| Cristian Martínez Borja
|LDU Quito
| align=center | 24
|-
| align=center | 2
| Gabriel Torres
|Independiente del Valle
| align=center | 16
|-
| align=center | 3
| Víctor Figueroa
|Aucas
| align=center | 14
|-
| rowspan=2 align=center | 4
| José Cevallos
|Emelec
| rowspan=2 align=center | 13
|-
| Francisco Fydriszewski
|LDU Portoviejo
|-
| rowspan=3 align=center | 6
| Juan Sebastián Herrera
|Macará
| rowspan=3 align=center | 11
|-
| Gonzalo Mastriani
|Guayaquil City
|-
| Muriel Orlando
|Mushuc Runa
|-
| rowspan=4 align=center | 9
| Facundo Barceló
|Emelec
| rowspan=4 align=center | 10
|-
| Damián Díaz
|Barcelona
|-
| Michael Hoyos
|Guayaquil City
|-
| Sergio López
|Aucas
|}

Source: Soccerway

See also
 Ecuadorian Serie A
 2020 in Ecuadorian football
 2020 Ecuadorian Serie B
 2020 Segunda Categoría
 2020 Superliga Femenina
 2020 Ecuadorian Women's Serie B

References

External links
 LigaPro's official website
 Ecuadorian Football Federation 

2020 in Ecuadorian football
Ecuador
Ecuador